Chentsy is a rural locality (a village) in Klyazminskoye Rural Settlement, Kovrovsky District, Vladimir Oblast, Russia. The population was 1 as of 2010.

Geography 
The village is located 2 km south from Klyazmensky Gorodok, 17 km north-east from Kovrov.

References 

Rural localities in Kovrovsky District